Roker Park is a recreation park in the Roker area of Sunderland, Tyne and Wear, England.

The land on which the park stands was donated by Sir Hedworth Williamson, 8th Baronet and the Church Commissioners, and opened on 23 June 1880. The park is roughly an upside down reversed 'L' shape. It is bounded by Park Parade to the south, Roker Park Terrace to the east, Roker Park Road to the west and Side Cliff Road to the north. The northern part of the park is the widest and fronts onto Roker beach via a ravine, which passes under a wooden footbridge. In the centre of the park is a large freeform boating lake which is used for remote-controlled model boating. In the northwest corner of the park is a model narrow gauge railtrack which was built in the 1970s. There are two bowling greens as well as tennis and multi-purpose sports courts.

Listed buildings

Bandstand
The park's bandstand is octagonal, cast-iron with a wood base and a metal-covered roof.

Drinking fountain
The memorial drinking fountain in the park commemorates Sir Hedworth's gift of land for Roker Park. It is made of ashlar, sandstone and granite and was erected by 'scholars, teachers and friends of Sunday Schools in Sunderland to commemorate the celebration of the centenary of Sunday Schools and the opening of Roker Park June 23 1880.

Sunderland Illuminations
Sunderland Illuminations light up Roker Park and Seaburn from late September until early November.

Gallery

References

Parks and open spaces in Tyne and Wear
Urban public parks
Tourist attractions in the City of Sunderland
Grade II listed buildings in Tyne and Wear
Boating lakes
Sunderland
1880 establishments in England